Flapjacks from the Sky is the second studio album by American folk rock group Gandalf Murphy and the Slambovian Circus of Dreams released on High Noon Records in 2004.

Recording and production
The album was recorded at Sleepy Hollow Studios in New York City and produced by band members Joziah Longo and Sharkey McEwen. McEwen also performed the engineering, mixing and mastering. The band started recording the album in late 2001.

Critical reception

Soon after its release, radio exposure for the album was nearly nationwide in the United States.

Thom Jurek of AllMusic called the album sophisticated, mature, poetic, and funny in a tasteful, nonzany—or obvious—way. He said that despite the album's length, "time flies by" while listening to it. Jurek praised Joziah Longo's songwriting as superior to that of Tom Petty whose voice his resembles. He also lauded Sharkey McEwen as "a bloody natural lead guitarist who never overplays". Jurek called Tink Lloyd, who plays cello, piccolo, flute and accordion, a "musician's musician".

Track listing
All songs written by Joziah Longo.

Disc one
"Rocket" – 3:26
"Sunday in the Rain" – 4:41
"Kiss from Eve" – 3:24
"Moondog House" – 3:42
"Baby Jane" – 5:26
"I Wish" – 2:45
"Better Life" – 3:30
"Living with God" – 3:47
"Talkin' to the Buddha" – 9:43
"Big Eight Wheeler" – 5:54

Disc two
"Jump-Rope" – 3:42
"Bike" – 5:20
"Glide" – 4:06
"Gonna Get Up" – 1:53
"In Her Own World" – 4:16
"Sullivan Lane" – 4:29
"Look Ma No Hands" – 4:15
"Fumes" – 4:56
"Call to the Mystic" – 6:00
"Flapjacks from the Sky" – 7:11
"Nighttime (Ancient Murphy Bonus Track)" – 4:50
"The Yodel Song" (hidden track) - 2:21

Personnel

Gandalf Murphy and the Slambovian Circus of Dreams
 Joziah Longo – vocals, acoustic and electric guitars, bass, harmonica, jaw harp
 Tink Lloyd – accordion, cello, flute, piccolo, vocals
 Sharkey McEwen – electric, acoustic and slide guitars, bass, mandolin, keyboards, vocals
 Tony Zuzulo – drums, percussion, glockenspiel

Guest artists
 Alistair Farrant – organ, piano, harpsichord (on "Look Ma No Hands", "Fumes" and "Flapjacks from the Sky")
 Kolson Pickard – cornet (on "Call to the Mystic")
 Bob Muller – drums (on "Nighttime")

See also

References

2004 albums
Gandalf Murphy and the Slambovian Circus of Dreams albums